Sébastien Lipawsky (born 15 December 1977) is a retired Swiss football midfielder.

References

1977 births
Living people
Swiss men's footballers
FC Sion players
FC Luzern players
Étoile Carouge FC players
Association football midfielders
Swiss Super League players
People from Sion, Switzerland
Sportspeople from Valais